Phelps Architecture, Construction and Engineering High School or Phelps A.C.E. High School is a public high school in the northeast quadrant of the District of Columbia, United States. 

The school is often considered a prime example of the school investment program currently occurring in DC. Having fallen victim to time and neglect, the school was rebuilt by an award-winning architect from several smaller buildings into its current form. Along with architecture, construction, and engineering, other courses are also taught there, including vehicle maintenance/repair and operation of large vehicles such as cranes and diggers on state-of-the-art simulators. The school also has a small greenhouse where the students can tend plants. The school powers its buildings by various renewable energy sources (indicated by the color-coded pipes inside, each color denoting a different system). As part of their coursework, the school entrusts students to monitor and maintain components of this system.

References

External links 
 
 DCPS Profile

District of Columbia Public Schools
Educational institutions established in 1912
Vocational schools in the United States
Historically segregated African-American schools in Washington, D.C.
Public high schools in Washington, D.C.
1912 establishments in Washington, D.C.
Magnet schools in Washington, D.C.